María Florencia Labat (born 12 June 1971) is an Argentinian former professional female tennis player. She joined the WTA Tour in 1988 and retired in 2000. On 12 September 1994, Labat reached a career-high singles ranking of number 26 in the world.

WTA Tour finals

Singles 4 (0–4)

Doubles 17 (7–10)

ITF finals

Singles (7–2)

Doubles (4–2)

External links
 
 
 

1971 births
Living people
Argentine female tennis players
Olympic tennis players of Argentina
People from Pergamino
Sportspeople from Buenos Aires Province
Tennis players at the 1992 Summer Olympics
Tennis players at the 1995 Pan American Games
Tennis players at the 1996 Summer Olympics
Tennis players at the 2000 Summer Olympics
Pan American Games gold medalists for Argentina
Pan American Games medalists in tennis
Medalists at the 1995 Pan American Games